Delta Sigma Chi is an American fraternal organization for professionals in the area of Chiropractic.

History 

In 1913, there were three chiropractic schools in Davenport, Iowa: the Palmer School of Chiropractic, Universal College of Chiropractic and the Davenport College of Chiropractic. On July 4 of that year, a group of chiropractic students representing those schools held an Independence Day picnic at Credit Island. Within this large group, a smaller group of friends discussed the subject of a chiropractic Greek letter fraternity.

On July 13, 1913, the first meeting of the fledgling organization took place, which is now the celebrated birth of the legacy of Delta Sigma Chi (ΔΣΧ). The founding fathers include Harold Hughes of Medicine Hat, Alberta, Canada; J.D. Hills of Detroit, Michigan; John Reardon of Milwaukee, Wisconsin; Harry Cummings of Fort Lauderdale, Florida and S.E. Julander of Des Moines, Iowa. At that meeting they completed their plans for a Greek letter Professional Chiropractic Fraternity by electing temporary officers and appointed a committee to draft a constitution and bylaws. The official name selected: Delta Sigma Chi (DSC)  stands for Doctors of Straight Chiropractic. It was decided to limit the charter membership to twelve men, however the membership was opened and extended to 20.

Notable brothers 
On November 6, 1913, B.J. Palmer was initiated into the brotherhood of Delta Sigma Chi. Five years later Brother Palmer was unanimously elected the honorary president of the fraternity.  Clarence Gonstead was also a member.

Lasting goals and purpose 

Delta Sigma Chi is pledged to promote straight unadulterated chiropractic principles (as set forth by B.J. Palmer). In addition, the members promote good fellowship and brotherhood as well as brotherly feeling amongst chiropractors, schools and students.

Today, the fraternity has a membership of several thousand individuals all around the globe, who continue to guard the sacred trust of chiropractic. The fraternity has reprinted 9 of BJ Palmer's original books.

Fraternity mansion 

The Alpha chapter's Victorian-style mansion is known as the J. Monroe Parker-Ficke House. Construction began in 1881 and was finished three years later, with 38 rooms and call tubes for the servants. After completion, the final cost was $100,000. The home was originally constructed for James Monroe Parker, a wealthy Davenport financier. Later, however, it was acquired by C. A. Ficke. In 1978 the fraternity purchased the building.

References

External links 
http://www.dscbooks.com, Delta Sigma Chi website for reprinted works

Chiropractic organizations
Fraternities and sororities in the United States
Student organizations established in 1913
Professional Fraternity Association
Professional fraternities and sororities in the United States
1913 establishments in Iowa